Charles Merville Spofford CBE (November 17, 1902 – March 23, 1991) was an American lawyer who held posts in NATO and on the boards of numerous arts organizations.

Born in Saint Louis, Missouri, he was graduated Phi Beta Kappa from Yale University in 1924, where he was a member of Skull and Bones, and Harvard Law School in 1928.  He joined the New York law firm Davis Polk & Wardwell in 1930 and became a partner in 1940, retiring in 1973 after 33 years.  He served in the US Army during World War II, rising to the rank of brigadier general and earning the Purple Heart, Distinguished Service Medal, Legion of Honor, Croix de Guerre and Order of the British Empire.  From 1950 to 1952 he served in NATO as deputy US representative to the North Atlantic Council and later chair of the Council of Deputies and chair of the European Coordinating Committee.  He proposed to John D. Rockefeller III what would become the Lincoln Center for the Performing Arts in 1956 and served as president of the Metropolitan Opera Association from 1946 to 1950.

References

Biography at Munzinger Archive (German)
Generals of World War II

1902 births
1991 deaths
Davis Polk & Wardwell lawyers
NATO officials
United States Army generals
Recipients of the Croix de Guerre 1939–1945 (France)
Yale University alumni
Harvard Law School alumni
Recipients of the Distinguished Service Medal (US Army)
Recipients of the Legion of Honour
Commanders of the Order of the British Empire
20th-century American lawyers
United States Army generals of World War II